Richard Metzger (born July 28, 1965) is a television host and author. He was the host of the TV show Disinformation (United Kingdom Channel 4, 2000–01), The Disinformation Company and its website, Disinfo.com. He is currently the host of the online talk show Dangerous Minds.

Career
For several years Metzger hosted a talk show, The Infinity Factory, broadcast on Manhattan public-access television cable TV and distributed online through Pseudo.com. It was similar in tone and appeal to Art Bell and George Noory's paranormal Coast to Coast AM radio show, on which Metzger had also been a guest. Many of the interview subjects on this show would go on to be features in the Channel 4 series.

Metzger was the host of the TV show Disinformation, which aired for two seasons (2000 and 2001) on Channel 4 in the UK as part of their late night "4Later" programming block.

According to interviews, Metzger was told just twelve days prior to the first specials' air-date that he would have to cut 50% of the material from the show in order to pass the USA Network's corporate lawyers' scrutiny. Those four shows have subsequently been released on a DVD with a second bonus disc presenting highlights of The DisinfoCon, a 12-hour event featuring shock rocker Marilyn Manson via pre-Skype video chat, underground filmmaker Kenneth Anger, painter Joe Coleman, Douglas Rushkoff, Mark Pesce, Grant Morrison, Robert Anton Wilson, and others.

Metzger created the "Disinformation" website in 1996, and was able to regain control of the intellectual property rights and a $1.2 million investment by the site's original backer, cable giant TCI (now AT&T Broadband) after TCI CEO John Malone had demanded funds be cut off when news of Metzger's "anarchist bullshit" reached him. In 1997 he co-founded The Disinformation Company, which joined with Avenue A/Razorfish, and became part of the RSUB Network until 2001.

Books
Metzger has edited two books. Disinformation: The Interviews (2002) features unedited interviews with several of the characters and thinkers who were guests on the series such as Douglas Rushkoff, Joe Coleman, Paul Laffoley, Grant Morrison, Duncan Laurie, Peter Russell, Kembra Pfahler, Genesis P-Orridge, and Howard Bloom.  The Book of Lies: The Disinformation Guide to Magick and the Occult (2003) is an anthology of occult essays.

According to a footnote in Disinformation: The Interviews, Metzger is the uncredited male-voice interviewing Japanese pop singer Maki Nomiya of Pizzicato 5 on their song "This Year's Girl #2" (Matador Records EP CD: "5 x 5"). Metzger has also directed and produced several music videos in the 1980s for such New York "underground" luminaries as Bongwater (their animated "Power of Pussy"), John Sex and others.

References

External links
 Dangerous Minds
 

Living people
1965 births
Writers from Wheeling, West Virginia